Wādī Nakhlah is an area in the Hejazi region of Saudi Arabia between the cities of Mecca and Ta'if, which serves as a Miqat (Boundary) for the Islamic Ḥaram of Mecca.
Places

History
During the era of the Islamic Prophet Muhammad, a successful military operation was carried out here, known as the "Nakhla Raid". The Nakhla Raid was the seventh Caravan Raid, and the first successful raid against the Meccans. It took place in Rajab 2 A.H. (January 624 C.E.). The commander was 'Abdullah ibn Jahsh al-Asadi, whom Muhammad dispatched to Nakhlah as the head of 12 Emigrants with six camels.

See also

 List of expeditions of Muhammad
 Arabian Peninsula
 Sarat Mountains
 Hijaz Mountains
 Wadi

Notes

References

Places
Geography of Saudi Arabia